The 2007 Australian Carrera Cup Championship was a CAMS sanctioned national motor racing championship open to Porsche 911 GT3 Cup Cars (Type 997). It was administered by CupCar Australia Pty Ltd and promoted as the 2007 Carrera Cup Australia, and is recognised by CAMS as the fifth Australian Carrera Cup Championship.

Calendar
The championship was contested over an eight-round series with three races per round.
Round 1, Adelaide Parklands, South Australia, 4 March
Round 2, Winton Motor Raceway, Victoria, 20 May
Round 3, Hidden Valley Raceway, Northern Territory, 24 June
Round 4, Queensland Raceway, Queensland, 22 July
Round 5, Oran Park Raceway, New South Wales, 19 August
Round 6, Sandown Raceway, Victoria, 16 September
Round 7, Mount Panorama Circuit, New South Wales, 7 October
Round 8, Surfers Paradise Street Circuit, Queensland, 21 October

Points system
Championship points were awarded on a 60-54-48-42-36-30-27-24-21-18-15-12-9-6-6-3-3-3-3-3 basis for the first twenty places in each race with one point awarded for places 21st through to last.

Results

Race 1 of Round 5 at Oran Park was called early (after 10 of the scheduled 16 laps) due to TV commitments and as a result only half points were awarded.

References

External links
Official series website (via wayback.archive.org)
Official series website (current)
2007 Race Result Archive at www.natsoft.biz

Australian Carrera Cup Championship seasons
Carrera Cup Championship